is a Japanese Magic: The Gathering player. He is the most successful player in the individual portion of World Championships, winning one tournament and making the top eight of two others.

Career
Mori first appeared on the Pro Tour in the 2000–01 season, at Pro Tour Los Angeles. With three Grand Prix top eights and a ninth-place finish at the World Championship, he accumulated enough points to win the rookie of the year title that season. The following season Mori's success abated as he was unable to repeat his strong performance from the previous Worlds at the Pro Tour level. However, he did manage to make a number of Grand Prix top eights. In 2002–03, Mori played only one Pro Tour, Venice. While his finish at the tournament was mediocre, with his teammates Masashiro Kuroda and Masahiko Morita, he won the penultimate Masters Series, also held in Venice on the same weekend. The following season Mori failed to make the top eight of any premier event, although he did come close with a tenth-place finish at Pro Tour Kobe. In 2005, Mori played every Pro Tour but again failed to make a top 8 until the final event of the season, the World Championship. Beating Shuhei Nakamura, Tomohiro Kaji, and Frank Karsten, Mori won the tournament and became the 2005 World Champion. Another top eight appearance at the next World Championship made him the first World Champion to make it back to the top eight of a World Championship after his win. He also captained the Japanese national team to a second-place finish. The following year came to solid start for Mori. He finished ninth at Pro Tour Geneva. However, he was given a six-month suspension for accumulated game play warnings after the following event. In spite of this, Mori made his third, and to date final, Pro Tour Top eight at the World Championship that year. He lost in the quarterfinal to the eventual champion Uri Peleg.

Accomplishments

References

Living people
Japanese Magic: The Gathering players
1983 births
People from Osaka Prefecture
Players who have won the Magic: The Gathering World Championship